Daang Hari (literally the "Road [of the] King"), also known as the Las Piñas–Muntinlupa–Laguna–Cavite Link Road (LPMLC Link Road), is a collector road that links southern Metro Manila to the province of Cavite in the Philippines.

The road was completed in 2005 by the Department of Public Works and Highways (DPWH), and is composed of two roads, the Las Piñas–Muntinlupa–San Pedro Road (which include the present Daang Reyna) within Metro Manila, and the original Daang Hari through Bacoor and Imus.

Route description
Most of sections of Daang Hari Road is a four-lane median divided highway.

A spur road, named Daang Reyna, leads to some gated communities in Muntinlupa and San Pedro, Laguna via Magsaysay Road. The spur is mostly a two-lane divided road.

Daang Hari is named in honor to Vista Land founder, former Senator Manuel Villar, Jr.

Las Piñas to Muntinlupa
Daang Hari's northern terminus is at the junction with Commerce Avenue in Madrigal Business Park near Alabang Town Center where it is a continuation of the short Investment Drive from Alabang–Zapote Road. The road forms the border between Barangay Ayala Alabang and Poblacion of Muntinlupa to the east and Barangay Almanza Dos of Las Piñas to the west. The road passes the following villages from north to south: T.S. Cruz Subdivision, Ayala Alabang, Ayala Southvale, Versailles, Katarungan Village, and Portofino Heights before coming to a roundabout with Daang Reyna and Muntinlupa–Cavite Expressway (MCX) near Evia Lifestyle Center.

Muntinlupa to Imus
From the Daang Reyna junction, the road curves sharply to the west and traverses the Molino villages of Bacoor including, from east to west, Verdana Homes, Malipay and Springville South. It intersects with Molino-Paliparan Road where SM Center Molino is located. A few hundred meters west of Molino Paliparan Road, Daang Hari enters Imus passing through Barangay Pasong Buaya before terminating at the intersection with Aguinaldo Highway in Anabu near the boundary with Salitran, Dasmariñas where The District mall is located. A flyover is under construction to divert through traffic on the existing intersection with Aguinaldo Highway. As of 2019, the flyover was now opened to the public.

Imus to General Trias
Daang Hari includes an extension to General Trias named Open Canal Road, also named Daang Hari Extension. The original road existed as an access road for irrigation canals maintained by the National Irrigation Authority (NIA). The road passes Lancaster New City Cavite and other nearby subdivisions and some paddy fields before ending at Arnaldo Highway in barangay Pasong Camachile. Open Canal Road runs as a minor local road up to Governor Ferrer Drive. The road is currently under road widening.

Daang Hari–SLEx Link Road

A  connector road was built to link Daang Hari Road to South Luzon Expressway (SLEx) in Muntinlupa near San Pedro, Laguna. The toll road, the first Public Private Partnership (PPP) project under the administration of President Benigno Aquino III with Ayala Corporation, runs from the roundabout with Daang Reyna and Daang Hari east towards the Susana Heights interchange of SLEx traversing the New Bilibid Prison (NBP) Reservation in Muntinlupa.

The toll road, now known as the Muntinlupa–Cavite Expressway, was opened to traffic on July 24, 2015.

Intersections

Spur

Daang Reyna 

Daang Reyna, or Vista Avenue, is a  spur of Daang Hari, starting from the Daang Hari–MCX Interchange near Evia Lifestyle Center. It is named in honor to Manny Villar's wife, Senator Cynthia Villar. It spur off Daang Hari at the roundabout near Muntinlupa–Cavite Expressway and continues south towards another roundabout with Victoria Avenue, which leads to Muntinlupa and ends in Magsaysay Road in San Pedro, Laguna. The road lies near the Muntinlupa–Las Piñas boundary and passes near gated communities like Portofino South and Amore at Portofino, owned by Vista Land.

Intersections

References

Roads in Metro Manila
Roads in Cavite